Cora is a ghost town in Smith County, Kansas, United States.

History
Cora was issued a post office in 1871. The post office was discontinued in 1904.

References

Former populated places in Smith County, Kansas
Former populated places in Kansas